Ecdysone 20-monooxygenase is an enzyme that catalyzes the chemical reaction

ecdysone + AH2 + O2  20-hydroxyecdysone + A + H2O

The three substrates of this enzyme are ecdysone, an electron acceptor AH2, and O2, whereas its three products are 20-hydroxyecdysone, the reduction product A, and H2O.

This enzyme belongs to the family of oxidoreductases, specifically those acting on paired donors, with O2 as oxidant and incorporation or reduction of oxygen. The oxygen incorporated need not be derive from O miscellaneous. The systematic name of this enzyme class is ecdysone,hydrogen-donor:oxygen oxidoreductase (20-hydroxylating). Like other genes in the ecdysone synthesis pathway, it belongs to Cytochrome P450 Halloween genes, with the nickname shade, other names in common use include alpha-ecdysone C-20 hydroxylase, and ecdysone 20-hydroxylase.

References

EC 1.14.99
Enzymes of unknown structure